Tavarede is a parish in the municipality of Figueira da Foz, Portugal. The population in 2011 was 9,441, in an area of 10.71 km².

References

Freguesias of Figueira da Foz